Clay High School is a public high school in Oregon, Ohio, United States, east of Toledo. It is the only high school in the Oregon City School District.  The school is named for Jeremiah Clay, who donated his farmland for the school to be built on.

Over the last few years the Clay High School Campus has undergone remodeling. An addition was made to the main building, while the old elementary and the Annex were demolished. The Main building also was gutted and redone.

The school colors are green and yellow. Their nickname is the Eagles, after their mascots Eddy and Edna the Eagle. Clay was a member of the Great Lakes League until 2003 when they joined the Toledo City League. Clay's joining of the TCL made them the second non-Toledo team to join the league (Cardinal Stritch 1971-1994) though they have played the Toledo City League schools for years prior to joining.  In 2011, Clay joined the newly formed Three Rivers Athletic Conference as a charter member.

Demographics

Career Technical Education Programs
Clay High School offers Career Technical Education (CTE) programs, also sometimes referred to as Career Tech, as a form of vocational education.  The current CTE programs offered are:

Automotive Technologies
Construction Trades
Cosmetology
Culinary Arts
Engineering Design & Development
Environmental & Agriculture
Integrated Machining & Engineering
Marketing
Medical Technologies
Musical Theatre
Programming & Software Development

Athletics

Ohio High School Athletic Association Team State Championships
 Boys Baseball – 1979

Performing Arts

Marching, Concert, and Symphonic Band
The modern band program at Clay was started by Clay graduate and saxophonist Nancy Fox Bricker in 1952, cementing the band as a marching band known as the Clay High School Fighting Eagle Marching Band. After Mrs. Bricker became ill and her husband assumed directing duties, Clay graduate Charles Neal was made the new director in 1967. The traditions of the Clay band were continued and expanded by its next director, Clay graduate Brian Gyuras, who was named the new director in 1999 and brought back student direction of the band. The current director of the band is Joseph Kuzdzal, who has held the position since 2019.

The band performs at Clay football games, and during the off season performs concerts and other parades. The band is split into two sections based on grade level, the concert band for freshmen and sophomores, and the symphonic band for juniors and seniors. The band also has multiple subgroups, in the form of jazz band and pep band. The band also claims the largest Alumni band in Ohio, which performs every other year during the homecoming football game.

Concert Chorale
Clay High School includes a choir program in the form of Concert Chorale. The program educates students in various subjects of good musicianship, and contributes to an enrolled student's fine arts credit needed to graduate. The program also puts on multiple concerts throughout the school year, and performs at other events. The current director of the program is Thom Sneed.

The Concert Chorale is also host to Varsity Voices, an audition based group which learns additional music outside of the school day to perform at concerts. The program also formerly had two gender based groups, a men's chorus and an all female chorus named "Bel Canto".

Theater Department
Aside from the Musical Theatre CTE program, Clay High School also has a theatre group in the form of the CHS Limelighters. The group typically puts on three productions per school year, and membership is open to the Clay student body. The group puts on a combination of musicals, plays, and one-acts and is under the direction of Thom Sneed, Leah Walsh, and Elizabeth Gibson.

Notable alumni

 A. J. Achter - Former pitcher Michigan State University, currently plays for the Los Angeles Angels
 Kate Achter - Current head coach of Detroit Mercy women's basketball team, formerly spent six seasons at Loyola Chicago
 Chris Fussell - Former pitcher with the Baltimore Orioles
 Jordan Kovacs - Former safety and captain for the University of Michigan football team, currently a defensive quality control coach for the Cincinnati Bengals
 Justin Thomas - Pitcher with the Uni-President 7-Eleven Lions of the Chinese Professional Baseball League
 Eric Herman - NFL Offensive Guard for the Indianapolis Colts.

References

External links
 Oregon City Schools Official website of Oregon City Schools

High schools in Lucas County, Ohio
Public high schools in Ohio